Andrew Friend (born 24 April 1969) is an Australian rugby union coach and former player. He is currently the head coach of Irish province Connacht. He was previously head coach of the Australia Sevens team, the Brumbies in Super Rugby, English club Harlequins, and Canon Eagles and Suntory Sungoliath in the Japanese Top League.

Playing career
Friend was selected in the Australia Schoolboys rugby team for 1986–87 before going on to play provincial rugby for the ACT Kookaburras. His position of choice was full-back.

Club coaching
Friend began his coaching career within an Australian Institute of Sport rugby programme in 1995. He held assistant coaching positions at the New South Wales Waratahs and the Brumbies. He was also the Brumbies skills coach under Eddie Jones.

In the summer of 2005, Friend joined English Premiership team Harlequins as head coach. Following the conclusion of the 2007-08 season, he signed a three-year contract with the Canberra-based Brumbies side.

He took over from Laurie Fisher as head coach at the Super Rugby club. After completing two full seasons in charge, Friend has his contract terminated in March 2011 following a loss to the Melbourne Rebels and rumours of player discontent. He was the third coach to either be fired or not have their contract renewed by the ACT Brumbies board. After helping out as a trainer for various Canberra high school teams, Friend went to Japan in 2012 and became the head coach at Canon Eagles for two seasons. He was head coach of Suntory Sungoliath from 2014 to 2016.

Friend was appointed as the head coach of Pro14 side Connacht on a three-year deal in May 2018.

Inaugural inductee to University of Canberra Sport Walk of Fame in 2022.

International coaching
Friend guided the Australian Under-21 team to the final of the 2005 World Championships. He worked within the Wallabies setup for the 2002 Tri Nations Series and 2003 Rugby World Cup. He was appointed as head coach of the Australian Sevens team in 2016.

Charity bike ride
Following an accident in 2010 when his wife, Kerri Rawlings, came off her bike and suffered a serious brain injury, Andy Friend undertook a 5000 km journey from Cooktown to Canberra to raise awareness and money for Acquired Brain Injury. This was to support Brain Injury Australia and Outward Bound. The journey was successful, with his wife as part of the support crew, and was completed in late November 2011.

References

External links
Harlequins profile

1969 births
Living people
Australian rugby union players
Australian rugby union coaches
Australian Olympic coaches
ACT Brumbies coaches
Coaches of international rugby sevens teams
Connacht Rugby non-playing staff
People educated at Canberra Grammar School
Rugby union players from Canberra
Australian expatriate sportspeople in England
University of Canberra alumni